Ray Mears' World of Survival is a 1997 book written by Ray Mears and a TV series by the same name.

References

1997 books
Books by Ray Mears
Survival manuals